The Burnaby Lakers are a Junior "A" box lacrosse team from Burnaby, British Columbia. The Lakers play in the British Columbia Junior A Lacrosse League.

Burnaby Cablevision 1969 - 1989
Burnaby Lakers 1990 - present

Dynasties

1970s
During the 1970s, the Cablevision won seven league championships and three straight Minto Cup national championships (1977–1979).

Late 1990s/2000s
From 1996 to 2007, the Lakers won 12 straight league championships, which included three undefeated regular seasons (1998, 1999, 2006). The Lakers had a total record of 242-26-1 during those 12 seasons. They would also win the Minto Cup 5 times (1998, 2000, 2002, 2004, 2005).

See also
 Burnaby Lakers (WLA) - the Senior "A" affiliate that competes in the Western Lacrosse Association.

External links
 Burnaby Jr A Lakers
BC Jr A Lacrosse League
The Bible of Lacrosse

Lacrosse teams in British Columbia
Sport in Burnaby
Lacrosse clubs established in 1969
1969 establishments in British Columbia